Leménil-Mitry is a commune in the Meurthe-et-Moselle department in north-eastern metropolitan France.

It had only three inhabitants in 2017, making it one of the least-inhabited communes in France.

Population

The recorded population was only made of two people in 1990, and was continued to having a population of two people in 1999. In 1968, the recorded population was four people, then was increased to five people in 1975, and was fallen into four people in 1982. The current population only made of three people in 2019 (which was decreased two people in 1999 to three people in 2007).

The commune's population in 2017 only made of three people living (one male and two females).

See also
 Communes of the Meurthe-et-Moselle department

References

Lemenilmitry